In telecommunication, the term reradiation has the following meanings:

Electromagnetic radiation, at the same or different wavelengths, i.e., frequencies, of energy received from an incident wave.
Undesirable radiation of signals locally generated in a radio receiver. This type of radiation might cause interference or reveal the location of the device.

Near-field effects of an AM antenna may extend out  or more. Cellular and microwave towers within this radius can reflect the Medium Wave AM signal out at a phase which cancels the main Medium Wave AM signal. This process results in an interfering signal called reradiation.

Radio communications